The NB Haifa School of Design, named after Neri Bloomfield and formerly WIZO Canada, is a college of art located in the German Colony in downtown Haifa, Israel. It is the leading professional and academic institution for higher education in art in northern Israel. The academy's president is Dr David Alexander.

History
The academy was founded in 1971 by the international WIZO organization to train professional artists and art teachers. Initially, the academy shared a building with the WIZO high school of art in the neighbourhood of Upper Hadar. In 2004 the academy moved down to a refurbished modern building in the German Colony.

Departments 
The academy has six departments in the design professions - Architecture, Management, Graphic design, Photography, Film and Fashion design. The design studies are combined with getting a diploma in education, and the academy is thus destined to qualify the students to become teachers in the post-primary schools in the fields of design and art.

Building
The building that houses the academy today, formerly a youth centre owned by the city, was renovated by architects Yoram Poper and Esti&Eli Hirsch(E.E.Hirsch Architects) together with Galit Rmeo/ Luciano Santandreu, winners of the design competition. The entrance floor serves as a gallery to alternating exhibitions of the students and artists. The building's interior was designed in a modern and dynamic style whereas its exterior blends with the character of other old structures in the German Colony.

References

External links 

 The NB Haifa School of Design
 http://www.wizoex.co.il

Colleges in Israel
Design schools
Buildings and structures in Haifa